Afroedura maripi, also known as the Mariepskop flat gecko or Maripi rock gecko, is a species of African gecko, first found in the Limpopo and Mpumalanga provinces of South Africa.

References

Further reading

External links
Reptile database entry

Afroedura
Reptiles described in 2014
Endemic reptiles of South Africa